Tetum is an Austronesian language spoken on the island of Timor. It is one of the official languages of Timor-Leste and it is also spoken in Belu Regency in Indonesian West Timor.

There are two main forms of Tetum as a language:

 Tetum Terik, which is a more indigenous form of Tetum marked by different word choice, less foreign influence and other characteristics such as verb conjugation
 Tetum/n Prasa ('market Tetum', from the Portuguese word  meaning 'town square') or Tetum/n Dili (given its widespread usage in the capital Dili). This is the form of Tetum (heavily influenced by Portuguese) that developed in Dili during colonial rule as local Tetum speakers came into contact with Portuguese missionaries, traders and colonial rulers. In East Timor Tetun Dili is widely spoken fluently as a second language.

Ethnologue classifies Tetun Terik as a dialect of Tetun. However, without previous contact, Tetun Dili is not immediately mutually intelligible, mainly because of the large number of Portuguese origin words used in Tetun Dili. Besides some grammatical simplification, Tetun Dili has been greatly influenced by the vocabulary and to a small extent by the grammar of Portuguese, the other official language of East Timor.

Nomenclature
The English form Tetum is derived from Portuguese, rather than from modern Tetum. Consequently, some people regard Tetun as more appropriate. Although this coincides with the favoured Indonesian form, and the variant with m has a longer history in English, Tetun has also been used by some Portuguese-educated Timorese, such as José Ramos-Horta and Carlos Filipe Ximenes Belo.

Similar disagreements over nomenclature have emerged regarding the names of other languages, such as Swahili/Kiswahili and Punjabi/Panjabi.

History and dialects

According to linguist Geoffrey Hull, Tetum has four dialects:

Tetun-Dili, or Tetun-Prasa (literally 'city Tetum'), is spoken in the capital, Dili, and its surroundings, in the north of the country. Because of its simpler grammar than other varieties of Tetun, extensive Portuguese loanwords, and supposed creole-like features, Ethnologue and some researchers classify it as a Tetun-based creole. This position, however, is also disputed in that while Tetun-Dili may exhibit simpler grammar, this does not mean that Tetun-Dili is a creole. According to Ethnologue, there were 50,000 native Tetun-Dili speakers in East Timor in 2004 and  L2 users.
Tetun-Terik is spoken in the south and southwestern coastal regions. According to Ethnologue, there were 50,000 Tetun-Terik speakers in East Timor in 1995.
The Nana'ek dialect is spoken in the village of Metinaro, on the coastal road between Dili and Manatuto.

Tetun-Belu and Tetun-Terik are not spoken outside their home territories. Tetun-Prasa is the form of Tetum that is spoken throughout East Timor. Although Portuguese was the official language of Portuguese Timor until 1975, Tetun-Prasa has always been the predominant lingua franca in the eastern part of the island.

In the fifteenth century, before the arrival of the Portuguese, Tetum had spread through central and eastern Timor as a contact language under the aegis of the Belunese-speaking Kingdom of Wehali, at that time the most powerful kingdom in the island. The Portuguese (present in Timor from c. 1556) made most of their settlements in the west, where Dawan was spoken, and it was not until 1769, when the capital was moved from Lifau (Oecussi) to Dili that they began to promote Tetum as an inter-regional language in their colony. Timor was one of the few Portuguese colonies where a local language, and not a form of Portuguese, became the lingua franca: this is because Portuguese rule was indirect rather than direct, the Europeans governing through local kings who embraced Catholicism and became vassals of the King of Portugal.

When Indonesia occupied East Timor between 1975 and 1999, declaring it "the Republic's 27th Province", the use of Portuguese was banned, and Indonesian was declared the sole official language, but the Roman Catholic Church adopted Tetum as its liturgical language, making it a focus for cultural and national identity. After the United Nations Transitional Administration in East Timor (UNTAET) took over governance in September 1999, Tetun (Dili) was proclaimed the country's official language, even though according to Encarta Winkler Prins it was only spoken by about 8% of the native population at the time, while the elite (consisting of 20 to 30 families) spoke Portuguese and most adolescents had been educated in Indonesian. When East Timor gained its independence on 20 May 2002, Tetum and Portuguese were declared as official languages. The 2010 census found that Tetum Prasa had 385,269 native speakers on a total population of 1,053,971, meaning that the share of native Tetum Prasa/Dili speakers had increased to 36.6% during the 2000s.

In addition to regional varieties of Tetum in East Timor, there are variations in vocabulary and pronunciation, partly due to Portuguese and Indonesian influence. The Tetum spoken by East Timorese migrants in Portugal and Australia is more Portuguese-influenced, as many of those speakers were not educated in Indonesian.

Vocabulary

Indigenous
Some more words in Tetum:

 – 'high'
 – 'bad'
 – 'tree'
 – 'fruit'
 – 'spice'
 – 'water'
 – 'friend'
 – 'big'
 – 'good'
 – 'love'
 – 'person, people'
 – 'place'
 – 'woman'
 – 'mountain'
 – 'moon/month'
 – 'war'
 – 'hungry'
 – 'eat'
 – 'food'
 – 'drink'
 – 'all'
 – 'one'
 – 'night'
 – 'little'
 – 'low'
 – 'child'
 – 'crocodile'
 – 'fast'
 – 'mirror'
 – 'inside'
 – 'language'
 – 'word' (from  'voice' and  'fruit')
 – 'voice', 'language'
 – 'true'
 – 'day'
 – 'afternoon'
 – 'sacred'
 – 'man'
 – 'god'
 – 'life'
 – 'country'
 – 'sea'
 – 'year'
 – 'very'
 – 'dirt'
 – 'hard'
 – 'first'
 – 'head'

From Portuguese
Words derived from Portuguese:

 – 'goodbye'
 – 'help'
 – 'learn', from 
 – 'too much'
 – 'decision', from 
 – 'education', from 
 'instead of', from 
 – 'so', 'well', from 
 – 'school', from 
 – 'government', from 
 – 'church'
 – 'history', from 
 – 'generation', from 
 – 'cheese', from 
 – 'understand', from 
 – 'less', from 
 – 'thanks', from 
 – 'bread', from 
 – 'people', from 
 – 'teacher', from 
 – 'religion', from 
 – 'week'
 – 'work', from 
 – 'beer', from 
 – 'must', from 
 – 'chief', from 
 – 'idea'
 – 'music', from 
 – 'experience', from 
 – 'technology', from 
 – 'force', from 
 – 'electricity', from 
 – 'terrorism', from 
 – 'embassy'
 – 'organization', from 
 – 'architecture', from 
 – 'coffee', from 
 – 'equipment', from 
 – 'president', from 
 – 'pillowcases', from 
 – 'airplane', from 
 – 'company', from 
 – 'television', from 
 – 'engineering', from 
 – 'corruption', from 
 – 'police', from 
 – 'physics', from 
 – 'profession', from 
 – 'impossible', from 
 – 'guitarist', from 
 – 'passport', from 
 – 'message', from 
 – 'Christmas', from

From Malay

As a result of Bazaar Malay being a regional lingua franca and of Indonesian being a working language, many words are derived from Malay, including:

 'hundred', from 
 'much', from 
 'can', from 
 'iron', from 
 'rain', from 
 'way' or 'road', from 
 'stone', from 
 'moon' or 'month' from 
 'foreigner', from  'Malay'
 'hot', from 
 'thousand', from 
 'wrong', from 
 'help', from 
 'kitchen', from 
 'house', from 

In addition, as a legacy of Indonesian rule, other words of Malay origin have entered Tetum, through Indonesian.

Numerals
 'one'
 'two'
 'three'
 'four'
 'five'
 'six'
 'seven'
 'eight'
 'nine'
 'ten'
 'twenty'

Combinations
Tetum has many hybrid words, which are combinations of indigenous and Portuguese words. These often include an indigenous Tetum verb, with a Portuguese suffix -dór (similar to '-er'). For example:

  ('to eat')  – glutton
  ('to drink')  – heavy drinker
  ('to say')  – chatterbox, talkative person
  ('to nag, pester')  – nag, pest

Basic phrases
 – 'Good morning'  (from Portuguese ).
 – 'How are you?' (literally 'Are you well or not?')
 – 'I'm fine.'
 – 'Thank you', said by a male/female (from Portuguese ).
 – 'Do you speak Tetum?'
 – 'Right'
 – 'No.'
 []  – 'I [do not] understand' (from Portuguese ).

Grammar

Morphology

Personal pronouns 

Nouns and pronouns

Plural 

The plural is not normally marked on nouns, but the word  'they' can express it when necessary.

 'woman/women' →  'women'

However, the plural ending -s of nouns of Portuguese origin is sometimes retained.

 – United States (from )
 – United Nations (from )

Definiteness 

Tetum has an optional indefinite article  ('one'), used after nouns:

 – a child

 – this child, the child
 – that child, the child

 – these children, the children
 – those children, the children

Possessive/genitive 

The particle  forms the inalienable possessive, and can be used in a similar way to 's in English, e.g.:

 – 'João's house'
 – 'Cristina's book'

When the possessor is postposed, representing alienable possession,  becomes :

 – the people of East Timor

Inclusive and exclusive we 

Like other Austronesian languages, Tetum has two forms of we,  (equivalent to Malay ) which is exclusive, e.g. "you, I, and they".

 – 'our [family's] car'
 – 'our country'

Nominalization 

Nouns derived from verbs or adjectives are usually formed with affixes, for example the suffix -na'in, similar to "-er" in English.

  'write' →  'writer'

The suffix -na'in can also be used with nouns, in the sense of 'owner'.

  'house' →  'householder'
In more traditional forms of Tetum,  the circumfix ma(k)- -k is used instead of -na'in.

The suffix -teen (from the word for 'dirt' or 'excrement') can be used with adjectives to form derogatory terms:

 'false' →  'liar'

Adjectives

Derivation from nouns 

To turn a noun into a nominalised adjective, the word  ('person, child, associated object') is added to it.

 'foreigner' →  'foreign'

To form adjectives and actor nouns from verbs, the suffix -dór (derived from Portuguese) can be added:

 'tell' →  'talkative'

Gender 

Tetum does not have separate masculine and feminine gender, hence  (similar to // in Malay) can mean either 'he', 'she' or 'it'.

The masculine and feminine forms of other adjectives derived from Portuguese are sometimes used with Portuguese loanwords, particularly by Portuguese-educated speakers of Tetum.

In some instances, the different gender forms have distinct translations into English:

 – 'handsome'
 – 'pretty'

 'son' →  'daughter'

Comparatives and superlatives 

Superlatives can be formed from adjectives by reduplication:

 'much, many' →  'very much, many'
 'big, great' →  'huge, enormous'
 'good' →  'very good'
 'last' →  'the very last, final'
 'clean, clear' →  'spotless, immaculate'

 — Maria is older than Ana.

To describe something as the most or least, the word  ('all') is added:

 — Maria is the oldest.

Adverbs 

Adverbs can be formed from adjectives or nouns by reduplication:

 'good' →  'well'
 'new, recent' →  'newly, recently'
 'night' →  'nightly'
 'quick' →  'quickly'
 'day' →  'daily'

Prepositions and circumpositions 

Most prepostional concepts of English are expressed by nominal phrases formed by using , the object and the position (expressed by a noun),optionally with the possessive .

 — 'inside the house'
 — 'on top of the mountain'
 — 'on the table'
 — 'under the chair'
 — 'outside the country'
 — 'between the people'

Verbs

Copula and negation 

There is no verb to be as such, but the word , which translates as 'not to be', is used for negation:

 — 'The Timorese are not Indonesians.'

The word , which roughly translates as 'who is' or 'what is', can be used with fronted phrases for focusing/ emphasis:

 — 'It's John who likes beer.'

Interrogation 

 — 'Are you crazy?'
 — 'Do you like me?'

Derivation from nouns and adjectives 

Transitive verbs are formed by adding the prefix ha- or hak- to a noun or adjective:

 'liquid' →  'to liquify, to melt'
 'mad' →  'to drive mad'
 'union' →  'to unite'
 'shade' →  'to shade, to cover'
 'hot' →  'to heat up'

Intransitive verbs are formed by adding the prefix na- or nak- to a noun or adjective:

 — '(to be) liquified, melted'
 — '(to be) driven mad'
 — '(to be) united'
 — '(to be) shaded, covered'
 — '(to become) heated up'

Conjugations and inflections (in Tetun-Terik) 

In , verbs inflect when they begin with a vowel or consonant h. In this case mutation of the first consonant occurs. For example, the verb  ('see') in  would be conjugated as follows:

 —  'I see'
 — 'you (sing.) see'
 — 'he/she/it sees'
 — 'we see'
 — 'you (pl.) see'
 — 'they see'

Tenses

Past  

Whenever possible, the past tense is simply inferred from the context, for example:

 – 'Yesterday I ate rice.'

However, it can be expressed by placing the adverb  ('already') at the end of a sentence.

 – 'I've (already) eaten rice.'

 – 'I don't eat rice anymore.'

In order to convey that an action has not occurred, the word  ('not yet') is used:

 – 'I haven't eaten rice (yet).'

When relating an action that occurred in the past, the word  ('finally' or 'well and truly') is used with the verb.

 – 'I ate rice.'

Future 

The future tense is formed by placing the word  ('will') before a verb:

 – 'I will give them food.'

 – 'I will not give them food.'

Aspects

Perfect 

The perfect aspect can be formed by using .

 – 'I have eaten rice / I ate rice.'

When negated,  indicates that an action ceased to occur:

 – 'I didn't eat rice anymore.'

In order to convey that a past action had not or never occurred, the word  ('not yet' or 'never') is used:

 – 'I didn't eat rice / I hadn't eaten rice.'

Progressive 

The progressive aspect can be obtained by placing the word  ('stay') after a verb:

 – 'They're (still) working.'

Imperative 

The imperative mood is formed using the word  ('go') at the end of a sentence, hence:

 – 'Read the letter!'

The word  ('just' or 'a bit') may also be used when making a request rather than a command:

 – 'Just read the letter.'

 – 'Don't smoke here!'
 – 'Don't kill them!'

Orthography and phonology

The influence of Portuguese and to a lesser extent Malay/Indonesian on the phonology of Tetun has been extensive.

In the Tetum language,  and  tend to have relatively fixed sounds.
 

All consonants appearing in parenthesis are used only in loanwords.

Stops: All stops in Tetum are un-aspirated, meaning an expulsion of breath is absent. In contrast, English stops, namely 'p' 't' and 'k' are generally aspirated. 
 
Fricatives: 

As Tetum did not have any official recognition or support under either Portuguese or Indonesian rule, it is only recently that a standardised orthography has been established by the National Institute of Linguistics (INL). The standard orthography devised by the institute was declared official by Government Decree 1/2004 of 14 April 2004.

The current orthography originates from the spelling reforms undertaken by Fretilin in 1974, when it launched literacy campaigns across East Timor, and also from the system used by the Catholic Church when it adopted Tetum as its liturgical language during the Indonesian occupation. These involved the transcription of many Portuguese words that were formerly written in their original spelling, for example,  →  'education', and  →  'colonialism'.

Thus,  'sir' became , and  'worker' became . Thus,  'sir' became , and  'worker' became .

As well as variations in the transliteration of Portuguese loanwords, there are also variations in the spelling of indigenous words. These include the use of double vowels and the apostrophe for the glottal stop, for example  →  'large' and  →   'small'.

In the sociolect of Tetum that is still used by the generation educated during the Indonesian occupation,  and  may occur in free variation. For instance, the Portuguese-derived word  'example' is pronounced  by some speakers, and conversely  'January' is pronounced .

See also

Languages of East Timor
The Lord's Prayer in Tetum at Wikisource

References

National Institute of Linguistics, National University of East Timor (Archived) includes several bilingual Tetum dictionaries, and articles about Tetum
Hull, Geoffrey, Standard Tetum-English Dictionary 2nd Ed, Allen & Unwin Publishers 
Official Web Gateway to the Government of Timor-Leste – Religion & Language
The standard orthography of the Tetum language (PDF)
Matadalan Ortografiku ba Lia-Tetun - Tetum Spelling Guide
Damien LEIRIS - Personal approach of the Tetum language (PDF)
Colonization, Decolonization and Integration: Language Policies in East Timor, Indonesia, by Nancy Melissa Lutz
Current Language Issues in East Timor (Dr. Geoffrey Hull)

External links

Peace Corps East Timor Tetun Language Manual (2011, 2nd edition; 2015, 3rd edition)
Intensive Tetun language courses at Dili Institute of Technology
Pictures from a Portuguese language course, using Tetum, published in the East Timorese newspaper Lia Foun in Díli (from Wikimedia Commons)
Tetun website with sound files
Teach yourself Tetum... an interview with some information on the history of Tetum
Wordfinder (Tetun/English minidictionary) and other publications available from Dili 
Damien LEIRIS - Personal approach of the Tetum language (PDF)
Tetun dictionary
Tetum illustrated dictionary
Dili Institute of Technology Institute of Technology website
A Traveller's Dictionary in Tetun-English and English-Tetun includes some information on grammar, based on the Tetun-Terik dialect
Sebastião Aparício da Silva Project for the Protection and Promotion of East Timorese Languages
Suara Timor Lorosae Daily newspaper in Tetum and Indonesian
Jornal Nacional Semanário Tetum page
Tetum dictionaries
Tetun 1, Tetun 2 Tetun writing courses for East Timorese university students, by Catharina Williams-van Klinken, Dili Institute of Technology
Talk Tetum in Timor VisitEastTimor.com Travel Guide help you to talk in East Timor
Robert Blust's field notes on Tetun are archived with Kaipuleohone
 

 
Languages of East Timor
Languages of Indonesia
Timor–Babar languages
Subject–verb–object languages